Between 1947 and 1977, General Electric polluted the Hudson River by discharging polychlorinated biphenyls (PCBs) causing a range of harmful effects to wildlife and people who eat fish from the river. Other kinds of pollution, including mercury contamination and cities discharging untreated sewage, have also caused problems in the river.

In response to this contamination, activists protested in various ways; for instance, musician Pete Seeger founded the Hudson River Sloop Clearwater and the Clearwater Festival to draw attention to the problem. Environmental activism nationwide led to passage of the federal Clean Water Act in 1972 and the Toxic Substances Control Act of 1976.

Extensive remediation actions on the river began in the 1970s with the implementation of wastewater discharge permits and consequent reduction of wastewater discharges, and sediment removal operations, which have continued into the 21st century. Fish consumption advisories remain in effect.

Types of pollution and other environmental impacts
The New York State Department of Environmental Conservation (NYSDEC) has listed various portions of the Hudson as having impaired water quality due to PCBs, cadmium, and other toxic compounds. Hudson River tributaries with impaired water quality (not necessarily the same pollutants as the Hudson main stem) are Mohawk River, Dwaas Kill, Schuyler Creek, Saw Mill River, Esopus Creek, Hoosic River, Quaker Creek, and Batten Kill. Many lakes in the Hudson drainage basin are also listed. Other ongoing pollution problems affecting the river include: accidental sewage discharges, urban runoff, heavy metals, furans, dioxin, pesticides, and polycyclic aromatic hydrocarbons (PAHs).

Numerous factories that once lined the Hudson River poured garbage and industrial waste directly into the river. These factories produced transformers, capacitors, and electric motors, which used PCBs as dielectric and coolant fluid. This pollution was not comprehensively assessed until the 1970s. By that time, the largest remaining factories in the area were owned by General Electric, which became primarily responsible for cleaning the Hudson River. Between approximately 1947 and 1977, GE released  of PCBs into the river. The PCBs came from the company's two capacitor manufacturing plants at Hudson Falls and Fort Edward, New York. The U.S. Environmental Protection Agency (EPA) banned the manufacture of PCBs in 1979. The bulk of the PCBs in the river were manufactured by Monsanto Co. under the brand names Aroclor 1242 and Aroclor 1016. The highest concentration of PCBs is found in the Thompson Island Pool.

Another noted polluter was General Motors, which operated the North Tarrytown Assembly in North Tarrytown, New York (now known as Sleepy Hollow). The  plant was in operation from 1896 to 1996. The plant used about 1 million gallons of water per day, which was returned to the river as waste. The plant's industrial waste (primarily lead chromate and other painting, cleaning, and soldering chemicals) would be emptied directly into the river. Domestic waste would be processed through the village's sewage treatment plant. Around 1971, the village's Sewer and Water Superintendent assured that the pollution reports were exaggerated, and that he and other residents would swim by a beach nearby, however Dominick Pirone, an ecologist and former director of the Hudson River Fishermen's Association (now Riverkeeper) was quoted as saying: "You can tell what color cars they are painting on a given day by what color the river is."

A 2008 study suggested that mercury in common Hudson River fish, including striped bass, yellow perch, largemouth bass, smallmouth bass and carp, declined strongly over the preceding three decades. The conclusions were extracted from a large database of mercury analyses of fish fillets accumulated by NYSDEC and collected over much of the length of the Hudson, from New York City waters to the Adirondack watershed. The research indicated that the trends were in line with the recovery that the Hudson River experienced over the preceding few decades, in response to the efforts of activist groups, government officials and industry by cooperating to help clean up the river system.

In 1991, zebra mussels, an invasive species, first appeared in the Hudson River, causing the near-disappearance of native pearly mussels.

In 2010, the NYSDEC determined that the Indian Point Energy Center, a nuclear power plant in Buchanan, was violating the Clean Water Act because of its large withdrawals of water from the Hudson, which kills millions of fish and other aquatic organisms each year. The state requested that Entergy, the plant operator, replace its fish screens with cooling towers to mitigate the environmental impacts. In 2017 the State of New York and Entergy reached agreement that the Indian Point plant would close in 2021. The plant permanently stopped generating energy on April 30, 2021.

Effects
The PCBs caused extensive contamination of fish in the river and apparently triggered a rapid evolutionary change in the Atlantic tomcod, which after about 50 years of exposure evolved a two amino acid change in its AHR2 receptor gene, causing the receptor to bind more weakly with PCBs than normal. The mutation does not prevent the tomcods from accumulating PCBs in their bodies and passing them on to striped bass and whatever else eats them. This system of passing contamination on to larger organisms is also known as biomagnification. The toxic chemicals also accumulated in sediments that settled to the river bottom.

In 1976 NYSDEC banned all fishing in the Upper Hudson because of health concerns with PCBs.

Fish advisories issued by the New York State Department of Health (DOH) remain in effect as of late 2022. DOH recommends eating no fish caught from the South Glens Falls Dam to the Federal Dam at Troy. Women over 50 and children under 15 are not advised to eat any fish caught south of the Palmer Falls Dam in Corinth, while others are advised to eat anywhere from one to four meals per month of Hudson River fish, depending on species and location caught. The Department of Health cites mercury, PCBs, dioxin, and cadmium as the chemicals impacting fish in these areas.

PCBs are thought to be responsible for health concerns that include neurological disorders, lower IQ and poor short-term memory (active memory), hormonal disruption, suppressed immune system, cancer, skin irritations, Parkinson's disease, ADHD, heart disease, and diabetes. PCB contamination in humans may come from drinking the contaminated water, absorption through the skin, eating contaminated aquatic life, and/or inhaling volatilized PCBs. PCB contamination is especially dangerous for pregnant and nursing women. The contamination can reach the fetus and potentially cause birth defects. Contamination through breast milk can also have harmful effects on the child indirectly.

Cleanup
In 1966, Pete Seeger and Toshi Seeger founded Hudson River Sloop Clearwater, an environmental education organization and an actual boat (a sloop), that promotes awareness of the river and its history. Clearwater gained national recognition for its activism starting in the 1970s to force a clean-up of PCB contamination of the Hudson caused by GE and other companies. Other specific Hudson watershed problems with which Clearwater is concerned are development pressures in the southern half of the Hudson Valley, pesticide runoff, the Manhattan west side waterfront, Indian Point nuclear reactors, and New York/New Jersey Harbor dredge spoil disposal.

In 1972 Congress passed the Clean Water Act and established a nationwide discharge permit system for all surface waters. All Hudson River point source dischargers were required to obtain permits issued by NYSDEC. The restrictions in these permits led to an overall reduction in pollutant loadings to the river, as factories, power plants and municipalities installed or improved their wastewater treatment systems or made other plant modifications to reduce pollution. Among the prominent sewage plant upgrades was the completion of the North River Wastewater Treatment Plant in Manhattan, where 150 million gallons per day of untreated sewage was discharged to the river until the plant opened in 1986. However, persistent pollutants such as PCBs and heavy metals, that had been discharged prior to implementation of the new permit requirements, remained in the sediments of the river.

In 1980, Consolidated Edison (Con Ed) agreed to drop its 17-year fight to build a pumped-storage hydroelectricity facility on Storm King Mountain, after a legal challenge by the non-profit environmental organization Scenic Hudson. The actions of local citizen organizations that led to the Con Ed decision spurred the creation of Riverkeeper, a non-profit environmental organization that grew into a global umbrella organization, the Waterkeeper Alliance.

In 1984, EPA declared a  stretch of the river, from Hudson Falls to New York City, to be a Superfund site requiring cleanup. This hazardous waste site is considered to be one of the largest in the nation. Many programs aim to reduce the PCB pollution. In 1991, further PCB pollution was found at Bakers Falls, near the former GE Hudson Falls factory, and a program of remediation was started. In August 1995, a  reach of the upper Hudson was reopened to fishing, but only on a catch-and-release basis. Removal of contaminated soil from Rogers Island was completed in December 1999.

The worst PCB hotspots are targeted for remediation by removing and disposing of more than 2.6 million cubic yards of contaminated sediment. The dredging project is the most aggressive environmental effort ever proposed to clean up a river, and will cost GE about $460,000,000. General Electric took the position that dredging the river would actually stir up PCBs. In 2002, EPA ordered GE to clean up a  stretch of the Hudson River it had contaminated. EPA also announced that an additional  of contaminated sediments in the upper Hudson River would be removed.

GE began sediment dredging operations to clean up the PCBs on May 15, 2009. Over 620 barges filled with sediment were transported to the processing facility on the Champlain Canal, and over 80 rail cars transported the dredged sediment to a waste facility in Andrews, Texas. The true scope of Phase One was about  more than planned, and Phase Two was to be expanded as a consequence. Phase Two of the cleanup will take approximately 5 to 7 years to complete. In 2010, General Electric agreed to finance and conduct a second dredging campaign at the Upper Hudson River between Fort Edward and Troy. These works have been supervised by EPA.

Although the cleanup has been slow, environmental advocacy groups have reached out to the general public on the condition of the river's pollution. Scenic Hudson, Hudson River Sloop Clearwater, Hudson Riverkeeper, and the Natural Resources Defense Council have continued to push for more action from General Electric. After Seeger's death in 2014, EPA Regional Administrator Judith A. Enck stated that "the incredible work" of Seeger and the Clearwater organization helped make the Hudson River cleaner.

Water quality improvement
The most recent comprehensive report on the health of the Hudson River, published in 2020, states that "Water quality in the Hudson River Estuary has improved dramatically since 1972 and has remained largely stable in recent years." Ecological health trends, such as in tributaries and wetlands, are varied in condition.

References

External links
Hudson River PCBs Superfund Site - EPA

Corporate scandals
Environmental issues in New York (state)
Pollution
Hudson River